The 2020 American Association season is the 15th season of professional baseball in the American Association of Professional Baseball (AA) since its creation in October 2005. Due to the COVID-19 global pandemic the league only field 6 teams and played a shortened season.  The league held a dispersal draft of the players on the teams that did not take the field this season.

Season schedule
Due to the COVID-19 pandemic the league looked for a way to play the season.  The league fielded 6 teams for a 60 game schedule, using a 3 city hubs for home games.  The hub cities selected were Fargo, Sioux Falls and Milwaukee.  The week before the season started the Chicago Dogs were granted permission to play home games in Chicago. The Saint Paul Saints returned home August 4, 2021 The top two teams, The Milwaukee Milkmen and the Sioux Falls Canaries, competed in a best of 7 series for the championship. The Milkmen won the series 4-1.

Dispersal draft

Regular Season Standings

Statistical leaders

Hitting

Pitching

Notable players
Former Major League Baseball players who played in the American Association in 2020

See also
2020 in baseball
2020 Major League Baseball season
Impact of the COVID-19 pandemic on sports

References

American Association season
American Association of Professional Baseball
American Association, 2020